The Isaac King House and Barn, located near Philomath, Oregon, is listed on the National Register of Historic Places. The house was designed and built by William Pitman in c.1855. It has a steep, gabled roof with a boxed cornice and returns.

The barn was built in the late 1840s and is one of the oldest surviving barns in Oregon.  It has a hand-hewn frame and is "a rare, side drive thru, single lean-to type".

It was listed on the National Register in 1975 and received additional review in 1985.

See also
 National Register of Historic Places listings in Benton County, Oregon

References

1855 establishments in Oregon Territory
Barns on the National Register of Historic Places in Oregon
Houses completed in 1855
Houses in Benton County, Oregon
Houses on the National Register of Historic Places in Oregon
National Register of Historic Places in Benton County, Oregon